Tina is a female given name. It is diminutive for names such as Albertina, Bettina, Christina, Christine, Kristina,  Martina, Valentina, Faustina, etc. Its masculine counterpart is Tino or Tin. In Finland and Estonia, the name is written as Tiina. The word itself may have originated from Old English Tyne/Tyna/Tina, meaning river.

In the Russian language, Tina is a diminutive of the male first names Aventin and Avgustin and the female first names Aventina and Avgustina.

People
Tina (singer) (born 1984), Slovak singer
Tina Ambani, (born 1957), Indian film actress
Tina Anselmi (1927–2016), Italian politician and Italian resistance member
Tina Antolini, American radio producer and journalist
Tina Arena (born 1967), Australian singer
Tina Aumont (1946–2006), French-American actress
Tina Barrett (born 1976), British singer from S Club 7
Tina Bell (1957–2012), American singer
Tina Brown (born 1953), journalist, magazine editor, columnist, talk-show host and author
Tina Bursill (born 1951), Australian actress
Tina Campbell (born 1974), American singer from the contemporary gospel duo Mary Mary
Tina Cole (born 1943), American actress
Tina Connelly (born 1970), Canadian track and field athlete
Tina Cousins (born 1974), English singer-songwriter
Tina Cullen (born 1970), English field hockey forward
Tina Dutta (born 1985), Indian actress
Tina Fey (born 1970), American writer and actress
Tina Fontaine (1999–2014), Canadian murder victim
Tina Guo (born 1985), Chinese-American cellist and erhuist
Tina Harris (born 1975), American R'n'B singer
Tina Huang, American actress
Tina Ivanović (born 1973), Serbian pop-folk singer
Tina Karol (born 1985), Ukrainian singer
Tiina Kankaanpää (born 1976), Finnish discus thrower
Tina Kotek (born 1966), American politician
Tina Kover (born 1975), American translator
Tina Krajišnik (born 1991), Serbian basketball player
Tina Louise (born 1934), American actress
Tina Majorino (born 1985), American actress
Tina Malone (born 1963), English actress
Teena Marie (1956–2010), American singer
Tina May (born 1961), English jazz singer
Tina Maze (born 1983), Slovenian alpine skier
Tina McKenzie (born 1974), Australian wheelchair basketball player
Tina O'Brien (born 1983), English actress
Tina Onassis Niarchos (1929–1974), Greek socialite and shipping heiress
Tina Peters (born 1968), German field hockey player
Tina Poitras (born 1970), Canadian race walker
Tina Rättyä (born 1968), Finnish heptathlete
Tina Robnik (born 1991), Slovenian alpine skier
Tina Rodriguez (died 1986), American murder victim
Tina Satchwell (born 1972), missing Irish woman
Tina Smith (born 1958), American politician
Tina Strobos (1920–2012), Dutch psychiatrist who rescued Jews during the Holocaust
Tina Sugandh (born 1977), singer
Tina Susman, American journalist and editor and formerly missing person
Tina Trstenjak (born 1990), Slovenian judoka
Tina Turner (born 1939), American-born Swiss singer and actress
Tina Weirather (born 1989), Liechtenstein alpine skier
Tina Wesson (born 1960), American nurse, motivational speaker and reality TV personality
Tina Weymouth (born 1950), American bass player of Talking Heads fame
Tina Yuzuki (born 1986), Japanese actress, singer and former AV model
Tina Yothers (born 1973), former American child star

Fictional characters
Christina Gray, a character in A Nightmare on Elm Street (1984)
Tina, the damsel in distress of the movie The Return of the Living Dead (1985)
Teletina, the mascot of Teletoon from 1999 to 2007
Tina, played by Jessica Zucha on Barney & Friends
Tina Armstrong, a character from the fighting video game series Dead or Alive
Tina Belcher, a character from FOX's animated sitcom, Bob’s Burgers
Tina Blake, a character from the novel Carrie and the 2002 and 2013 movies.
Tina Branford, a fictional character from the Final Fantasy series; main character of Final Fantasy VI (6)
 Tina Fran, a character from the show SpongeBob SquarePants
Tina Carlyle, a character in the 1994 film The Mask
Tina Carter, a fictional character from the British soap opera EastEnders
Tina Cassidy, codenamed “Mainframe” in the animated series C.O.P.S.
Tina Cohen-Chang, a character from Glee
Tina Hopkins, a fictional character from the British soap opera, EastEnders
Tina Kennard, a character on The L Word
Tina Lombardi, a character in the 2004 film A Very Long Engagement
Tina Lord, a character from the American soap One Life to Live
Tina McIntyre, a fictional character from the popular British soap opera Coronation Street
Tina Martin, a character from Bibi Blocksberg and its spinoff Bibi & Tina
Tina Reilly, a fictional character from the British soap opera Hollyoaks
Tina Rex, a character from The Amazing World of Gumball
Tina Stewart, a fictional character from the popular British soap opera EastEnders
Tina Teaspoon, part of the Spoon family from UK children’s TV series Button Moon
Tina, a character from Tina's Pals and Monica's Gang
Tina Russo, A Fictional Character From The Looney Tunes Show

See also 

Tona (name)

References

Notes

Sources
Н. А. Петровский (N. A. Petrovsky). "Словарь русских личных имён" (Dictionary of Russian First Names). ООО Издательство "АСТ". Москва, 2005. 

Feminine given names